Helius (died 69) was a prominent freedman in the time of ancient Roman Emperor Nero. He and Patrobius exercised great and pernicious power and influence under Nero. Helius was the de facto ruler of Rome in the absence of Nero.

Early career
According to Cassius Dio, Helius was an imperial freedman of Claudius, later serving Nero.

Nero's reign
Under the reign of emperor Nero (r. 54–68 AD), Helius was at the head of the imperial court and conducted business on behalf of the emperor.

The fall of Junius Silanus
In 54 AD, the first death under the new emperor was that of Junius Silanus, proconsul of Asia. Without Nero's knowledge, the murder was planned through the treachery of Agrippina because Silanus was the son of a great-grandson of Augustus. The murder was performed by Publius Egnatius Celer, a Roman knight, and Helius, men who had the charge of the emperor's domains in Asia. According to Tacitus, they gave the proconsul poison at a banquet, too openly to escape discovery.

In 54 AD, Helius was in charge of the emperor's domains in Asia, and part of Agrippina's plot to murder the Proconsul of Asia, Junius Silanus.

Nero goes to Greece 
Nero became more and more insulated by flatterers and more convinced of his musical talents, committed to go to Greece and neglected Helius' warnings about disaffection at home, which would rise to a climax with the Vindex's rebellion.

Events in 64
In 64 AD, Nero left Helius in charge of Rome, with the full authority to confiscate, banish and execute men of all ranks without notifying Nero.

Events in 67–68
In 67 AD, Nero was present at the Olympic games in Greece. The Jewish War became a serious military commitment. Helius recalled emperor Nero to Rome in the winter of 67–68, forcing Nero to postpone his other ventures along with the news of Vindex rising which finally put an end to his plans.

"During the absence of Nero, Rome was controlled by a freedman named Helius and by Tigellinus' colleague Nymphidius, who expanded his control of the imperial guard. After Nero's return at the end of the winter of 67/68, Tigellinus was obviously the lesser of the two prefects."

Galba's reign
In 69 AD, Helius was executed along with several other of Nero's favourites after Galba came to power. They were marched in chains around the city before they were publicly executed.

Ancient Roman sources

Helius in Tacitus
Helius is mentioned by Roman historian and politician, Publius Cornelius Tacitus, in his work the Annals, in connection with the power struggles in 46.

13:1 "1 The first death under the new principate, that of Junius Silanus, proconsul of Asia, was brought to pass, without Nero's cognizance, by treachery on the part of Agrippina. It was not that he had provoked his doom by violence of temper, lethargic as he was, and so completely disdained by former despotisms that Gaius Caesar usually styled him "the golden sheep"; but Agrippina, who had procured the death of his brother Lucius Silanus, feared him as a possible avenger, since it was a generally expressed opinion of the multitude that Nero, barely emerged from boyhood and holding the empire in consequence of a crime, should take second place to a man of settled years, innocent character, and noble family, who — a point to be regarded in those days — was counted among the posterity of the Caesars: for Silanus, like Nero, was the son of a great-grandchild of Augustus. Such was the cause of death: the instruments were the Roman knight, Publius Celer, and the freedman Helius, who were in charge of the imperial revenues in Asia. By these poison was administered to the proconsul at a dinner, too openly to avoid detection. With no less speed, Claudius' freedman Narcissus, whose altercations with Agrippina I have already noticed,4 was forced to suicide by a rigorous confinement and by the last necessity, much against the will of the emperor, with whose still hidden vices his greed and prodigality were in admirable harmony."

Helius in Dio
Helius is mentioned several times by Roman statesman and historian, Cassius Dio.

63:12 "1 As for the people in Rome and Italy, he had handed them all over to the tender mercies of a certain Helius, an imperial freedman. This man had been given a complete authority, so that he could confiscate, banish or put to death ordinary citizens, knights, and senators alike, even before notifying Nero. 2 Thus the Roman empire was at that time a slave to two emperors at once, Nero and Helius; and I am unable to say which of them was the worse. In most respects they behaved entirely alike, and the one point of difference was that the descendant of Augustus was emulating lyre-players and tragedians, whereas the freedman of Claudius was emulating Caesars. 3 As regards Tigellinus, I consider  him a mere appendage of Nero, because he was constantly with him; but Polycleitus and Calvia Crispinilla, apart from Nero, plundered, sacked and despoiled everything that it was possible to pillage. The former was associated with Helius at Rome, and the latter with the "Sabina" who was known as Sporus. 4 Calvia had been entrusted with the care of the boy and with the oversight of the wardrobe, though a woman and of high rank; and through her all were stripped of their possessions."

63:18 "1 This was what was going on in Greece. Is it worth while adding that Nero ordered Paris, the pantomimic dancer, to be slain because the emperor had wished to learn dancing from him but had not the capacity? Or that he banished Caecina Tuscus, the governor of Egypt, for bathing in the bath that had been specially constructed for the emperor's intended visit to Alexandria? 2 In Rome during this same period Helius committed many terrible deeds. Among other things he put to death one of the foremost men, Sulpicius Camerinus (c. 63–66 AD), together with his son, the complaint against them being that they would not give up their title of Pythicus, received from some of their ancestors, but showed irreverence toward Nero's Pythian victories by their use of this same title. 3 And when the Augustans proposed to make a statue of the emperor weighing a thousand pounds, the whole equestrian order was compelled to help to defray the expense they had undertaken. As for the doings of the senate, it would be a task to describe them all in detail; for so many sacrifices and days of thanksgiving were announced that the whole year would not hold them all."

63:19 "1 Helius had for some time been sending to Nero many messages urging him to return as quickly as possible, but when he found that no attention was paid to them, he went himself to Greece in seven days and frightened him by reporting that a great conspiracy against him was on foot in Rome. This report caused Nero to embark for Italy at once. 2 There was, indeed, some hope of his perishing in a storm and many rejoiced, but to no purpose, as he came safely to land; and for certain men the very fact that they had prayed and hoped that he might perish furnished a motive for their destruction."

64:3 "1 As he drew near the City, the guards of Nero met him and asked to be retained in the same service. At first he put them off, ostensibly to take the matter under advisement; 2 and when they would not listen to this but kept up a disturbance, he sent the army against them. As a result about seven thousand of them perished on the spot and the survivors were later decimated. This shows that even if Galba was bowed down with age and disease, yet his mind was vigorous and he did not believe that an emperor should submit to compulsion in anything. 3 Further proof is found in the fact that when the Praetorians demanded of him the money that Nymphidius had promised them, he would not give it, but replied: "I am accustomed to levy soldiers, not to buy them." And when the populace insistently demanded that Tigellinus and certain others who had lately been so insolent should be put to death, he did not yield, though he would probably have killed them if their enemies had not made this demand. 41 In the case, however, of Helius, Narcissus, Patrobius, Lucusta, the sorceress, and others of the scum that had come to the surface in Nero's day, he ordered them to be led in chains throughout the whole city and then to be executed."

Helius in Suetonius
Helius is mentioned once by Roman historian, Gaius Suetonius Tranquillus, in his work De Vita Caesarum, as the de facto ruler of Rome when Nero was absent in Greece in 67.

In early 67, Nero travelled to Greece to celebrate in public games, busy emulating the lyre-player. He left Rome under the full authority of his imperial freedman Helius. Now, Helius became the acting ruler in the absence of Nero. However, Nero became increasingly more unpopular, but ignored the advice of Helius to return to Rome. According to Seutonius, while at Olympia, Nero received interruptions from his imperial freedman Helius that affairs in Rome required his presence. Nero himself was more concerned about his theatrical character.

References

 Miriam Griffin (2002) Nero: The End of a Dynasty

Imperial Roman slaves and freedmen
Executed ancient Roman people
69 deaths